The RSWA Medal is an award from the Royal Society of Western Australia, established to honour outstanding work and achievement in science relative to Western Australia.

In 1924, the Royal Society of Western Australia decided to commemorate the centenary of the birth (26 June 1824) of William Thomson, Lord Kelvin. The event was marked by the creation of the Gold Medal of the Royal Society. The award was established to honour outstanding work and achievement in science relative to Western Australia. Miss Enid Isabel Allum, of 7 Richardson Street West Perth was commissioned to design the medal for £5-5-0 honorarium. Miss Allum was a member of the Royal Society of Western Australia, and had previously been Treasurer and Social Committee member. The Royal Mint at Perth commissioned the firm of Messrs. Stokes & Co, of Melbourne to produce the dye for the medal. In 1924, the inaugural medal was presented to Dr. William John Hancock. The first three medals were struck in gold in 1924, 1929, and 1933, and ever since the medals have been struck in silver. It is also known as the Kelvin Gold Medal.

In 2013, the RSWA Medal was renamed the RSWA Forrest Medal in honour of Sir John Forrest.

Recipients of Kelvin Gold Medal

References

External links
 RSWA Medal

Australian science and technology awards
Royal Society of Western Australia